HZH may refer to:

 HZH, IATA code for Liping Airport, Guizhou, China
 HZH, the Telegraph and Pinyin code for Hangzhou railway station, Zhejiang, China